Mount Sefrit is a  Skagit Range summit located three miles north of Mount Shuksan in the North Cascades of Washington state. It is situated in the Mount Baker Wilderness, which is managed by the Mount Baker-Snoqualmie National Forest. The summit offers views of Mount Shuksan, Mount Baker, and the Picket Range. Mount Sefrit's name honors Frank Ira Sefrit (1867–1950), editor and publisher of The Bellingham Herald for nearly 40 years. This mountain's name was officially adopted in 1952 by the U.S. Board on Geographic Names. Precipitation runoff from the mountain drains into the deep valleys of Ruth Creek and the Nooksack River which nearly encircle Mount Sefrit, except for Nooksack Ridge which connects it to Ruth Mountain.

Geology

The North Cascades features some of the most rugged topography in the Cascade Range with craggy peaks, ridges, and deep glacial valleys. Geological events occurring many years ago created the diverse topography and drastic elevation changes over the Cascade Range leading to the various climate differences. These climate differences lead to vegetation variety defining the ecoregions in this area.

The history of the formation of the Cascade Mountains dates back millions of years ago to the late Eocene Epoch. With the North American Plate overriding the Pacific Plate, episodes of volcanic igneous activity persisted.  In addition, small fragments of the oceanic and continental lithosphere called terranes created the North Cascades about 50 million years ago.

During the Pleistocene period dating back over two million years ago, glaciation advancing and retreating repeatedly scoured the landscape leaving deposits of rock debris. The "U"-shaped cross section of the river valleys are a result of recent glaciation. Uplift and faulting in combination with glaciation have been the dominant processes which have created the tall peaks and deep valleys of the North Cascades area.

Climate

Mount Sefrit is located in the marine west coast climate zone of western North America. Most weather fronts originate in the Pacific Ocean, and travel northeast toward the Cascade Mountains. As fronts approach the North Cascades, they are forced upward by the peaks of the Cascade Range, causing them to drop their moisture in the form of rain or snowfall onto the Cascades. As a result, the west side of the North Cascades experiences high precipitation, especially during the winter months in the form of snowfall. Because of maritime influence, snow tends to be wet and heavy, resulting in high avalanche danger. During winter months, weather is usually cloudy, but, due to high pressure systems over the Pacific Ocean that intensify during summer months, there is often little or no cloud cover during the summer.  The months July through September offer the most favorable weather for viewing or climbing this peak.

Gallery

See also

Geography of the North Cascades

References

External links
 Weather forecast: Mount Sefrit
Mt. Baker Wilderness U.S. Forest Service
Mt. Sefrit aerial photo PBase

Mountains of Washington (state)
Mountains of Whatcom County, Washington
North Cascades
Cascade Range
Mount Baker-Snoqualmie National Forest
North Cascades of Washington (state)
North American 2000 m summits